Simone Oliverio (died 1 November 1668) was a Roman Catholic prelate who served as Bishop of Fondi (1662–1668).

Biography
On 13 March 1662, Simone Oliverio was appointed during the papacy of Pope Alexander VII as Bishop of Fondi.
He served as Bishop of Fondi until his death on 1 November 1668.

References 

17th-century Italian Roman Catholic bishops
Bishops appointed by Pope Alexander VII
1668 deaths